DXDZ (92.9 FM), on-air as The Edge 92.9, is a radio station owned by Rizal Memorial Colleges Broadcasting Corporation and operated by Alemania Group of Companies. The station's studio is located at the top of Plaza Alemania Hotel, Quezon Ave. Ext., Iligan City.

It used to be the city's only Top 40 station until its reformat in mid-2012.

References

Radio stations in Iligan
Radio stations established in 2009